Williamson Head is a prominent cape 6 nautical miles (11 km) west-northwest of Drake Head on the coast of Antarctica. Discovered from the Terra Nova in February 1911 during Scott's last expedition. Named for Petty Officer Thomas S. Williamson, Royal Navy, a member of the expedition.

Headlands of Oates Land